Sector Control Point-Baghdad (also known as SCP-B or "skip bee")was being the primary and largest of the Iraq Survey Group's three operational groups. SCP-B, along with the core of the ISG staff, were located on Camp Slayer at the former Al Radwaniyah Presidential Site on Baghdad International Airport in western Baghdad.

From its founding in the spring of 2003 until disbandment at the end of February 2005, SCP-B was commanded by a series of coalition officers from the U.S. Army, U.S. Marines and Australian Army. Its first commander was U.S. Army Reserve Colonel George Waldroup, who led the group from its founding until the summer of 2004. He was later picked by U.S. Secretary of Defense Donald Rumsfeld to head the Strategic Support Branch of the Defense Intelligence Agency. Following COL Waldroup, USMC COL Frank Johnson was pulled from retirement and took the reins until October 2004.  COL Johnson was followed by Lt Col Andy Carr, an Australian engineer, who was briefly followed by MAJ Peck (now LTC).  The final commander of SCP-B was Australian Military Police Major Damien Hick.

SCP-B's missions included not only the search for WMD, but work on counter-terrorism and the ongoing investigation into the fate of U.S. Navy Captain Michael Scott Speicher, who was shot down during the Gulf War of 1991. Initially presumed dead, he was later declared missing when evidence emerged after the war that he had survived the crash of his aircraft.

SCP-B was organized into several Mobile Collection Teams, or MCTs, made up of members of American, British and Australian forces, with Americans providing the vast majority. An MCT generally consisted of a commander—usually a major or captain (although MCTs were led by lieutenants and full colonels at times) -- and anywhere from ten to twenty other personnel, depending on mission requirements. The majority of SCP-B personnel were mobilized American National Guard or Army Reserve Soldiers (although the United States Navy, Marines and Air Force, as well several coalition forces, were also well represented) as well as some US Army Special Forces Personnel and a small detachment of active duty soldiers from the 1st Cavalry Division. The other key piece of SCP-B were the U.S. Army Military Police crews assigned to the organization. The Military Police provided convoy and site security for the MCTs as well as secure transport for ISG personnel in their travels around Baghdad.  SCP-B also contained other special units, such as dog handlers (who were mostly civilian contractors), explosives ordnance disposal, ground-penetrating radar teams, satellite communications, and a WMD transportation and storage group.

External links
 Teaser of upcoming documentary film Land of Confusion featuring Pennsylvania Army National Guard Soldiers assigned to the SCP-B in 2004–05.

Defense Intelligence Agency